Olga Karasseva (born 6 October 1975) is a former Russian footballer who played as a forward for the Russia women's national football team. She was part of the team at the 1999 FIFA Women's World Cup and UEFA Women's Euro 2001.

References

External links
 

1975 births
Living people
Russian women's footballers
Russia women's international footballers
Women's association football forwards
1999 FIFA Women's World Cup players
WFC Rossiyanka players
CSK VVS Samara (women's football club) players
Russian Women's Football Championship players